Scot is a surname. Notable people with the surname include:

 Daniel Scot (21st century), co-director of Ibrahim Ministries International
 Lewis Scot (17th century), English pirate
 Michael Scot (c. 1175 – 1232), Scottish astrologer
 Reginald Scot (c. 1538 – 1599), English author
 Robert Scot (1744–1823), American artist
 Thomas Scot (died 1660), English Member of Parliament
 William Scot (13th century), Roman Catholic priest

See also
 Scott (name)

Ethnonymic surnames